Carina Kirssi Ketonen (born 1 August 1976) is a Finnish former racing cyclist. She won the Finnish national road race title in 2009 and 2010.

References

External links

1976 births
Living people
Finnish female cyclists
Place of birth missing (living people)